6,000 Enemies is a 1939 American drama film directed by George B. Seitz and starring Walter Pidgeon as a successful District Attorney who is framed on charge of bribery.  Although innocent, he is sent to prison where he fights to clear his name. The film also stars Rita Johnson.

Plot summary
Steve Donegan is an elected district attorney and launches an anti-organized crime campaign. Joe Silenus, a crime boss, plots to frame Donegan for accepting a bribe. Donegan is sentenced to prison, where he re-encounters all the men he convicted during his anti-crime crusade. Martin receives orders to eliminate Donegan. Anne Barry, the embezzlement convict, saves his life by alerting the guards to her screams.

Steve’s brother pursues Silenus, disguised as a chauffeur in order to prove his innocence. ‘Socks’ Martin knocks Steve Donegan down six times, but he keeps getting up and fighting. Two revolvers are smuggled into the prison inside a fruit basket meant for the warden. ‘Socks suggests that Steve join him in the prison break. When Phil arrives at the prison to see Steve, he is shot in the drive by just outside the gates. The prisoners riot as a result of the shots, and the rumored prison break begins.

Cast 
 Walter Pidgeon as Steve Donegan
 Rita Johnson as Anne Barry
 Paul Kelly as Dr. Malcolm Scott
 Nat Pendleton as 'Socks' Martin
 Harold Huber as Joe Silenus
 Grant Mitchell as Warden Alvin Parkhurst
 John Arledge as Phil Donegan
 J.M. Kerrigan as Dan Barrett
 Adrian Morris as 'Bull' Snyder
 Guinn 'Big Boy' Williams as Maxie (as Guinn Williams)
 Arthur Aylesworth as 'Bluebeard' Dawson
 Raymond Hatton as Prisoner 'Wibbie' Yern
 Lionel Royce as Prisoner 'Dutch' Myers
 Tom Neal as Prisoner Ransom
 Willie Fung as Wang

Box office 
According to MGM records, the film earned $233,000 in the US and Canada and $125,000 elsewhere, resulting in a profit of $22,000. It also featured the short "The Bear That Couldn't Sleep", which was the first Barney Bear short.

References

External links 
 
 
 
 

1939 films
American black-and-white films
Metro-Goldwyn-Mayer films
Films directed by George B. Seitz
1939 crime drama films
1930s prison films
American crime drama films
American prison drama films
Films scored by Edward Ward (composer)
1930s English-language films
1930s American films
English-language crime drama films